Walter Simon Newman (September 1921 – December 8, 2012) was a civic figure in San Francisco, responsible in part for a number of important civic and cultural events in the City's history.

Early life
Newman was an Infantry Officer during World War II where he was injured soon after D-Day. In 2009 the French government made him a Chevalier of the National Order of the Legion of Honour.

Projects
He was involved in the development of the Transamerica Building, Mission Bay, the showing of the King Tut artifacts in the 1970s, and the construction of University High School and the Veteran's Center at City College of San Francisco. Newman was a member of the San Francisco Planning Commission and the San Francisco Redevelopment Agency. He co-founded the National Brain Tumor Foundation after the death of his son from the disease.

References

1921 births
2012 deaths
People from San Francisco
Culture of San Francisco
Chevaliers of the Légion d'honneur
United States Army officers
Jewish American philanthropists
United States Army personnel of World War II
20th-century American philanthropists
21st-century American Jews
Military personnel from California